Flowerdown can refer to:

 Flowerdown Barrows, an ancient site in Hampshire, England
 RAF Flowerdown, a Royal Air Force station in Hampshire, England